Funky Essex also known as Funky SX is an Essex-based community radio station, licensed for The Real Sound of Young Essex. It originated as an internet radio station in 2009, and was awarded a legal community license in 2015. The station commenced broadcasting on 1 April 2016 on 103.7 FM and online, playing urban dance music including house, garage, grime, dance, drum & bass.

References

External links

Radio stations in Essex
Community radio stations in the United Kingdom